Adrian Ungur was the defending champion when the event was last held in 2014 but chose not to defend his title as he had retired from professional tennis.

Holger Rune won the title after defeating Orlando Luz 1–6, 6–2, 6–3 in the final.

Seeds

Draw

Finals

Top half

Bottom half

References

External links
Main draw
Qualifying draw

San Marino Open - 1
2021 Singles